Zduchovice is a municipality and village in Příbram District in the Central Bohemian Region of the Czech Republic. It has about 300 inhabitants.

Administrative parts
The village of Žebrákov is an administrative part of Zduchovice.

History
The first written mention of Zduchovice is in a donation deed of Duke Bretislav I from 1045.

References

Villages in Příbram District